Gyanpur is a town and a nagar panchayat in Bhadohi district in the Indian state of Uttar Pradesh and the administrative headquarters of Bhadohi district.

Geography 
It has an average elevation of 81 metres (265 feet).

Demographics 
As of 2011 Indian Census, Gyanpur had a total population of 45,808, of which 26,908 were males and19,900 were females. Population within the age group of 0 to 6 years was 1,622. The total number of literates in Gyanpur was 9,315, which constituted 72.7% of the population with male literacy of 78.3% and female literacy of 66.2%. The effective literacy rate of 7+ population of Gyanpur was 83.3%, of which male literacy rate was 89.3% and female literacy rate was 76.1%. The Scheduled Castes and Scheduled Tribes population was 1,167 and 19 respectively. Gyanpur had 2024 households in 2011.

 India census, Gyanpur had a population of 12,056. Males constitute 54% of the population and females 46%. The total number of literates in Gyanpur was 7,897 which is 65.5% of the total population. In Gyanpur, 15% of the population is under 6 years of age. The effective literacy of 7+ population was 77.4%.

Transportation

Railways
Gyanpur Road Railway station is situated in Gopiganj, Uttar Pradesh. Station code of Gyanpur Road is (GYN).

Education

Schools
Jawahar Navodaya Vidyalaya, established in 1991, is a CBSE affiliated school covering classes from VI to XII.

Gallery

References 

Cities and towns in Bhadohi district